The Coats (sometimes called The Coats Vocal Band) are an a cappella singing group which was founded in Seattle, Washington in 1987. The group consists of bass singer Kerry Dahlen, baritone Doug Wisness, Jamie Dieveney and Keith Michael Anderson as first and second tenors, respectively. The coats are known mainly on the Northwest coast for their Christmas albums and concerts. The members support local  Washington high schools by performing on their stages and donating a percentage of ticket sales to the schools fine arts program.

History

The group was formed while each of its four members were studying at the University of Washington. They began singing unprofessionally around Seattle, at such locations as Pike Place Market, to pay their way through college. However, their unique singing style attracted attention, and they were soon singing professionally throughout the west coast and other venues around the United States.

Name change

The Coats were originally known as "The Trenchcoats," but following the Columbine High School massacre, they became unintentionally associated with the Trenchcoat Mafia. Numerous news reports erroneously provided the singing group's web address as that of the killers, so it was quickly simplified to their group's current name.

Discography

The Coats have released two demos & thirteen albums as of December 2016:

 1989: The Trenchcoats (5 Song Demo)
 1992: It Turns Me On
 1994: Your Joy
 1995: Exposed
 1996: Are You Up?
 1999: When I'm With You
 2000: The Coats Collection
 2000: On Christmas Time
 2002: The Boys Are Back
 2005: Last a Lifetime
 2006: The Caroler - Christmas with The Coats
 2009: Caught On Tape
 2011: A Holiday Tasting (3 Song EP)
 2014: Highway 1
 2016: Shine On

External links
Official Website
Official Facebook

A cappella musical groups
Musical groups from Washington (state)